The history of the cinema of Cape Verde dates back to the arrival of filmmakers in the early twentieth century. The first picture house was established in Mindelo around 1922, called Eden Park.

The nation has two film festivals, the Cabo Verde International Film Festival (CVIFF), which takes place each year on the island of Sal with its first edition held in 2010. The Praia International Film Festival Cinema do Plateau on the island of Santiago with its first edition took place in 2014. The award-winning filmmaker, cinematographer, film editor, and digital media arts instructor, Guenny K. Pires, founded the PIFF. He is the first native-born Cape Verdean to write, direct, and produce documentary and narrative films about Cape Verde. Mr. Pires, a visionary filmmaker, has a mission to bring the history and culture of his native country to the world's attention. In 2005, he moved to Los Angeles, where he founded Txan Film Productions & Visual Arts, a four-member production company that produces documentaries, docudramas, fiction films, and educational materials.

Films
Os Flagelados do Vento Leste (1987)
Down to Earth (1995) - a drama film, directed by Pedro Costa
The Island of Contenda (1995) - drama film
Napomuceno's Will (1997)
Fintar o Destino (1998) - sports film
My Voice (Nha Fala) (2002)
The Journey of Cape Verde (2004)
Some Kind of Funny Porto Rican?': A Cape Verdean American Story (2006)
Batuque, the Soul of a People (2006) - a film about the music and dance genre of batuque
Santo Antão - Paisagem & Melodia (2006) [English: Santo Antão: Countryside & Songs, Capeverdean Creole: Santu Anton: Paisajen & Meludia]
Cabo Verde na cretcheu [ALUPEK: Kabuberdi na kretxeu] - a theatrical film
A Ilha dos Escravos (The Island of Slaves) (2008)
A menina dos olho grandes (2010)
Contract https://www.youtube.com/watch?v=GyM-aFL6x00 (2010)
Picture the Leviathan (2012)
Momento: Pupkulies & Rebecca Play Cabo Verde (2013) - set in the island of Maio
Another Land: Homage to John Ford (2013)
Buska Santu (2016) - short film
Coração Atlântico (Atlantic Heart) (2016) - dramatic feature film http://www.atlanticheart.com
Hora do Bai (2017) - short film
Sukuru (2017)
The Volcano's Last Wish (2020) - short/feature directed by Guenny K. Pires

Documentaries
Fogo, îl de feu (1979)
Un carnaval dans le Sahel (1979)
Morna Blues (1996) - directed by Anaïs Porsaïc and Éric Mulet
Amílcar Cabral (2001) - a short documentary film
The Music Cape (2004) - about the Baía das Gatas Music Festival
The Journey of Cape Verde (2004) directed by Guenny K. Pires https://www.youtube.com/watch?v=R6-yKMs_Hdc 
Arquitecto e a Cidade Velha [Architecture of Cidade Velha] (2007) - directed by Catarina Alves Costa
Mindelo: Traz d'horizonte (2008) [Portuguese: Mindelo: Tras de horizonte]
Cabo Verde Inside (2009) - an autobiographical documentary film
Kontinuasom (2009) - [English: Kontinuasom, Portuguese: Kontinuasom]
Carta d'Holanda (2010)
Bitú (2010) - about a Mindelo native painter, filmed in 2006
2010 Mindelo Carnival (Carnaval de Mindelo 2010, actually as Carnaval do Mindelo 2010) - about the carnival in Mindelo that happened in 2010
Cabralista (Amílcar-Cabralian) (2011)
Kolá San Jon (2011) about the festival of Saint John the Baptist (São João) - released in June
Proud to Be Cape Verdean: A Look at Cape Verdeans in the Golden State (2012)
Shouting: Tierra (2013) - a poetic documentary film about the intersection of the Atlantic
Tão longe é aqui (2013) [Capeverdean Creole: Tan longi é aki]
Tututa (2013)
 Terra Terra (2014) directed by Paola Zerman on music and carnival of Cape Verde
Firmeza (2018) directed by Paola Zerman, on hip hop of Mindelo
Contract (2010) directed by Guenny K. Pires 
In Search of my Identity (2012) directed by Guenny K. Pires
The Volcano's Last Wish (2020) directed by Guenny K. Pires

See also
 Media of Cape Verde

References

Further reading
Claire Andrade-Watkins, "Le cinéma et la culture au Cap Vert et en Guinée-Bissau", Cinémas africains, une oasis dans le désert ? (African Cinema, an Oasis by the Desert), Condé-sur-Noireau, Corlet/Télérama, 2003, p. 148-151, Collection CinémAction, no. 106

External links
History of Cinema in Cape Verde
Capeverdean films at the Internet Movie Database